Delta High School may refer to:

Delta High School (Alaska)
KIPP: Delta Collegiate High School, a school in Helena-West Helena, Arkansas
Delta High School (Clarksburg, California)
Delta Charter High School, a school in Tracy, California
Delta High School (Muncie, Indiana)
Delta High School (Ohio)
Delta High School (Utah)
Delta High School (Washington)

See also
Delta (disambiguation)
Delta Secondary School (disambiguation)
South Delta High School, a school in Rolling Fork, Mississippi